Leasor may be:
 an old spelling of lessor
 the surname of James Leasor